The Syvash or Sivash (Cyrillic: Сываш, "dirt"), also known as the  or  (Gniloye More; , Hnyle More; , Cyrillic: Чюрюк Денъиз), is a large area of shallow lagoons on the west coast of the Sea of Azov. The Henichesk Strait is its eastern connection to the Sea of Azov. The Syvash borders the northeastern coast of the main Crimean Peninsula. Central and Eastern Syvash were registered as wetlands of Ukraine under the Ramsar Convention. Since the 2022 Russian invasion of Ukraine, the entire Syvash has been occupied by Russia.

Overview
The Syvash nearly cuts the Crimean Peninsula off from the mainland, serving as a natural border for its autonomous republic. The long and narrow Arabat Spit runs to its east, separating it from the Sea of Azov. The two bodies are connected in the north at the Henichesk Strait beside the port of Henichesk. To its west, the isthmus of Perekop separates it from the Black Sea and connects Crimea to the mainland.

The Syvash is extremely shallow. Being very shallow, the waters in the Syvash heat up in the summer and produce a putrid smell. The wide area for evaporation also leaves the water extremely salty. The amount of various salts is estimated at 200 million metric tons. Several industrial plants harvest the mineral resources of Syvash. The Syvash area is a wetland of international importance. The shores are low, slightly sloping, swampy and salty. In summer, the water level of Syvash decreases significantly, revealing barren solonets soils called "syvashes" by locals.

The Syvash is sometimes divided into the Western Syvash and Eastern Syvash. These are connected to each other by the Chongar Strait.

History
During the Russian Civil War, the Syvash became famous for a surprise crossing by the Red Army during the Perekop-Chongar Operation.

Flora 
The Syvash may appear red in color due to the salt-tolerant micro-alga Dunaliella salina. 

The eastern parts of the Syvash contain less salt and are home to reeds and other wetland vegetation.

The large islands in the Central Syvash are mainly covered with steppes consisting of feather grass, tulips, tauric wormwood (Artemisia taurica), sage,  crested wheat grass, fescue.

The shores of the Syvash contains a large number of salt-tolerant vegetation, including glasswort, Tripolium, plantains, sea lavender (Limonium caspium), saltbush (Atriplex aucheri).

Gallery

References

External links

CC4 satellite photo

Bodies of water of Crimea
Bodies of water of the Sea of Azov
Lagoons of Ukraine
Ramsar sites in Ukraine
Wetlands of Ukraine